Robert S. Olson (born December 1, 1969) is a Republican member of the Kansas Senate, representing the 23rd district. He was previously a Representative in the Kansas House of Representatives, representing the 26th district from 2005 to 2010, having served as the Majority Whip. Olson was appointed to the Kansas Senate following Karin Brownlee's nomination to serve as Kansas Secretary of Labor.  The American Conservative Union gave him a lifetime rating of 83%.

Senate committee membership
Commerce
Former Chairman - Financial Institutions and Insurance
Current Chairman of Senate Utilities Committee

House committee membership
Joint Committee on Pensions, Investments and Benefits (Chairman)
Federal and State Affairs
Financial Institutions
Insurance
Select Committee on KPERS
Energy and Utilities

References

External links
Kansas Legislature - Robert Olson
Project Vote Smart profile
Kansas Votes profile
State Surge - Legislative and voting track record
Follow the Money campaign contributions:
2008

Republican Party Kansas state senators
Republican Party members of the Kansas House of Representatives
Politicians from Olathe, Kansas
Living people
1969 births
21st-century American politicians